Rohe is the territory or boundaries of iwi (tribes) of New Zealand.

Rohe may also refer to:
Rohe (mythology)
Rohe, Estonia, a village

People with the surname
Ludwig Mies van der Rohe, architect
Alice Rohe, journalist
Georgia van der Rohe, German dancer, actress and director
George Rohe (1874–1957), Major League Baseball infielder
Alice Rohe (1876–1957), American author and journalist
Philip Röhe (1994), German footballer

Surnames from given names